Out of the Storm is a 1926 American silent drama film directed by Louis J. Gasnier and starring Jacqueline Logan, Tyrone Power Sr. and Montagu Love.

Cast
 Jacqueline Logan as Mary Lawrence 
 Tyrone Power Sr. as Mr. Lawrence 
 Edmund Burns as James Morton 
 Montagu Love as Timothy Keith 
 Eddie Phillips as Leonard Keith 
 George Fawcett as Judge Meeman 
 Crauford Kent as Defense Attorney 
 Jay Hunt as Justice of the Peace 
 Joseph W. Girard as The Warden 
 Leon Holmes as Office Boy 
 Frona Hale as Aunt

References

Bibliography
 Munden, Kenneth White. The American Film Institute Catalog of Motion Pictures Produced in the United States, Part 1. University of California Press, 1997.

External links

1926 films
1926 drama films
Silent American drama films
Films directed by Louis J. Gasnier
American silent feature films
1920s English-language films
Tiffany Pictures films
American black-and-white films
1920s American films